Wittibreut is a municipality in the district of Rottal-Inn in Bavaria, Germany.

References

Rottal-Inn